Vlad Botoș is a Romanian politician currently serving as a Member of the European Parliament for the Save Romania Union (USR).

References

Living people
MEPs for Romania 2019–2024
Save Romania Union MEPs
Save Romania Union politicians
Year of birth missing (living people)